Thapelo Letsholo (born 28 February 1992) is a South African cricketer. He played in seven first-class and two List A matches for Border from 2015 to 2017.

See also
 List of Border representative cricketers

References

External links
 

1992 births
Living people
South African cricketers
Border cricketers
People from Krugersdorp